Crack the Sky is the debut album by American rock band Crack the Sky, released on LP in 1975 (see 1975 in music) by Lifesong Records (catalog #LS-6000).

Track listing

Personnel

The band
John Palumbo – Lead vocals, keyboards, guitar
Rick Witkowski – Lead guitar, percussion
Joe Macre – Bass guitar, back-up vocals
Jim Griffiths – Lead guitar, back-up vocals
Joey D'Amico – Drums, back-up vocals

Additional musicians
Michael Brecker — Horns ("She's a Dancer", "Mind Baby")
Randy Brecker — Horns ("She's a Dancer", "Mind Baby")
David Sanborn — Horns ("She's a Dancer", "Mind Baby")
George Marge — Woodwinds ("Robots for Ronnie", "Sleep", "Sea Epic")
Tom Jones — Trombone ("Sleep")

Production
Terence P. Minogue – Producer
Marty Nelson – Producer
William Kirkland – Producer
Donald Puluse – Recording and mixing engineer
Terry Cashman — Executive producer
Tommy West – Executive producer
Stan Kalina – Mastering engineer
Vinny Adinolfi – 2002 CD producer
Elliott Federman – 2002 CD remastering
Ted Brosman – Tape master

Additional credits
Recorded and mastered at CBS Studios, 52nd St., New York City
Recorded at Columbia Records Studio, 32nd St., New York (orchestra on "Ice")
Recorded at Minot Sound Studios, White Plains, New York ("Sleep")
Susan Senk – Cover coordination
Mary Walsh – Front cover photography
Benno Friedman – Back cover photography
Bob Heimall – Art direction and design
Danny Palumbo – Major domo
Petillo Strings – Acoustic guitar strings
"Thank you orchestra and all of our Stainless Steel Groups of Chums"
Amy Bennick – Art direction, design (2002 CD)
"Special thanks to Kevin Stander and Steve Smolen of Record & Tape Traders, Terence P. Minogue for taking the time to tell the story, and Mike Ragogna, as always for his guidance."
Merri Kirkland – Spanish translation ("I Don't Have a Tie")
2002 CD remastered at SAJE Sound, New York City

Alternate versions
In 1988, Lifesong released a CD pairing Crack the Sky with White Music on a single disc (LSCD-8801). To fit both albums on one CD, the song "Mind Baby" and two tracks from White Music were omitted. In 2002, a reinvented and mastered CD of Crack the Sky was released. It included four bonus tracks: demo versions of "Let Me Go Home (A Visit to the Projects)", "Eileen, I Lean on You", and "Hold On"; and "Dr. Octopus Part 2" from the Spider-Man: Rock Reflections of a Superhero album. It is noted the song "Sleep" fades out more than a minute earlier than the original LP version. Liner notes include track-by-track comments by original producer and long-time CTS compatriot, Terence P. Minogue.

References

Sources
LP and CD liner notes

1975 debut albums
Crack the Sky albums